Lawrence Alfred George Knight (16 July 1901 – 24 December 1973) was a New Zealand rugby union player. He was educated at Ellerslie Primary and then Auckland Grammar School. A loose forward, Knight represented and captained Auckland at a provincial level, making his debut as a 19-year-old. Knight was a member of the New Zealand national side, the All Blacks, in 1925. He played five matches for the All Blacks but did not appear in any tests. He died in Auckland in 1973, four months before his son Lawrie Knight was named in the 1974 All Blacks, and his ashes were buried at Purewa Cemetery.

Knight's younger brother, Arthur, was also an All Black. His cousin, Orton Wallace "Wally" Knight, was an Auckland, Manawatu and Canterbury representative and also played for England Services during World War II.

References

1901 births
1973 deaths
Rugby union players from Auckland
People educated at Auckland Grammar School
New Zealand rugby union players
New Zealand international rugby union players
Auckland rugby union players
Rugby union flankers
Burials at Purewa Cemetery